Andrei Olari (Андрей Оларь) (born in Tiraspol) is a professional rugby player and  rugby league footballer. He previously played for the Moldovan team Tiraspol and for the French clubs Villefranche and Toulouse Olympique. He has represented  both Moldova and Russia.

Playing career
In 1990 Olari won the first USSR Rugby League Cup as a member of the Tiraspol club, defeating the Moscow Magicians in the final with a score of 24-10. He scored 56 points in two matches against Spartak Moscow and Moscow Magicians scoring 7 tries, 13 conversions and 2 drop goals, which earned him the title of the best scorer in the USSR Cup.

Later Olari played for French clubs, such as Toulouse Olympique team: in the 1999 season he scored 12 points in 35 Super League matches.

International
In 1992, Olari captained the CIS national team for their 1992 Tour of South Africa, in which CIS won both games.

In 1995 he played in the Emerging Nations tournament for Moldova.

In 2000 Olari was invited by the Russian national team to play at the World Cup that year in England Olari played in all three of Russia's matches at the tournament. and played three matches in the tournament.

Personal
Olari's son, also named Andrei Olari, played with Toulouse Olympique and competed for them in the 2011 RFL Championship. He was called up by the Moldova national rugby union team in 2014 and became a player of the Odessa team Politekhnik.

References

Living people
Expatriate rugby league players in France
Moldova national rugby league team players
Moldovan emigrants to Russia
People from Tiraspol
Rugby league five-eighths
Rugby league locks
Russia national rugby league team captains
Russia national rugby league team players
Russian expatriate rugby league players
Russian expatriate sportspeople in France
Russian rugby league players
Toulouse Olympique players
Villefranche XIII Aveyron players
Year of birth missing (living people)